Burr Gore Steers is an American actor, screenwriter, and director. His films include Igby Goes Down (2002) and 17 Again (2009). He is a nephew of writer Gore Vidal.

Family
Steers was born in Washington, D.C. His father, Newton Ivan Steers, Jr. (1917–1993), was a businessman and politician who briefly served as a Republican congressman from Maryland. Through his mother, Nina Gore Auchincloss (born 1937), he is a grandson of stockbroker and lawyer Hugh D. Auchincloss, a cousin of Louis Auchincloss. Nina is also the stepsister of Jacqueline Kennedy Onassis and younger half-sister of the writer Gore Vidal.  Steers is a relative of vice president Aaron Burr, the third Vice President of the United States. Steers's great-grandfather Thomas Gore served as Oklahoma's first Democratic senator, from 1907 until 1921 and from 1931 until 1937, while his great-great-grandfather Oliver Burr Jennings was a founder of Standard Oil. Steers's godfather was former Virginia Senator John Warner.

His brother Hugh Auchincloss Steers (1963–1995) was an American figurative painter whose later works often focused on AIDS as a theme. He has another brother, Ivan Steers, and five stepsiblings from his mother's second marriage to editor Michael Whitney Straight.

Education
Steers grew up living in Bethesda, Maryland and Georgetown, Washington, D.C., where he attended St. Albans School. Steers was expelled from both the Hotchkiss School and Culver Military Academy. He eventually earned his GED and attended New York University.

Career
Steers has had minor roles in a few of Quentin Tarantino's films, playing Roger (or "Flock of Seagulls") in Pulp Fiction and providing one of the radio voices in Reservoir Dogs.  He also has appeared in The Last Days of Disco, Fix and Gore Vidal's Billy the Kid.

He wrote and directed Igby Goes Down in 2002, a coming-of-age film that starred Kieran Culkin and Susan Sarandon. Steers also was the screenwriter of the film How to Lose a Guy in 10 Days, which starred Kate Hudson and Matthew McConaughey. He has directed episodes of the television series Weeds, The L Word, Big Love, and The New Normal. Steers also directed the 2009 teen comedy film, 17 Again starring Zac Efron.

In 2010 Steers directed the drama Charlie St. Cloud, also starring Efron. Also in 2010, there was media coverage for Steers having been hired to direct an epic film about the early life of Julius Caesar to be based on the novels by Conn Iggulden as adapted from the first two novels of Iggulden's series, The Gates of Rome and The Death of Kings, and covering the years from 92 BC to 71 BC. Exclusive Media Group hired Steers after having the adaptation written by William Broyles and Stephen Harrigan.
Steers directed the 2016 film adaptation of the parody novel, Pride and Prejudice and Zombies.

Filmography

References

External links

1965 births
Living people
American male actors
St. Albans School (Washington, D.C.) alumni
Hotchkiss School alumni
Auchincloss family
Culver Academies alumni
Male actors from Washington, D.C.
New York University alumni
American male screenwriters
English-language film directors
People from Bethesda, Maryland
Film directors from Maryland
Screenwriters from Connecticut
Screenwriters from Maryland
Screenwriters from Washington, D.C.
People from Georgetown (Washington, D.C.)